The men's 100 metres at the 2012 World Junior Championships in Athletics was held at the Estadi Olímpic Lluís Companys on 10 and 11 July.

Medalists

Records

Results

Heats

Qualification: The first 2 of each heat (Q) and the 6 fastest times (q) qualified

Semifinal
Qualification: The first 2 of each heat (Q) and the 2 fastest times (q) qualified

Final
Wind: +0.1 m/s

Participation
According to an unofficial count, 71 athletes from 55 countries participated in the event.

References

External links
 WJC12 100 metres schedule

100 metres
100 metres at the World Athletics U20 Championships